"Unite!" is the twenty-third single by Ayumi Hamasaki, released on July 11, 2001. It is her sixth single released in Germany.

Unlike most of her other A-sides and some of her B-sides, Unite! has no PV. It has been performed on various occasions and has been featured on a commercial, yet no promotional video was ever aired.

Commercial tie-in 
Unite! was the background music in Hamasaki's last commercial for Kirin Supli.

Track listing
Asia-released single
 "Unite!" – 5:00
 "Unite!" (Huge UR-Chin mix)
 "Unite!" (hecco's club vocal mix)
 "Unite!" (re-Formation MIX)
 "Endless sorrow" (Dub's Forever Mercy Mix)
 "Unite!" (PROJECT O.T ATOMIX MIX)
 "Unite!" (PSYCHO TRANCE MIX)
 "Unite!" (No.1 Blueberry Wonderful)
 "Key" (nicely nice waterfowl remix)
 "Unite!" (Instrumental) – 5:00

Germany-released single
 "Unite!" – Airwave vocal edit
 "Unite!" – Moogwai radio edit
 "Unite!" – Alt+F4 radio edit
 "Unite!" – Robert Gitelman radio edit
 "Unite!" – Alt+F4 remix
 "Unite!" – Robert Gitelman remix
 "Unite!" – Airwave dub mix

Release history

Charts
Oricon Sales Chart (Japan)

 RIAJ certification: 2× Platinum

References

External links
 "Unite!" information at Avex Network.
 "Unite!" information at Oricon.

Ayumi Hamasaki songs
2001 singles
Oricon Weekly number-one singles
Songs written by Ayumi Hamasaki
2001 songs
Avex Trax singles